Serwaa Nyarko Senior High School is an all female secondary education institution in Kumasi in the Ashanti Region of Ghana.

References

Girls' schools in Ghana
High schools in Ghana
Education in Kumasi